Nemotelus is a genus of soldier flies in the family Stratiomyidae.  Nemotelus is known from the Nearctic, Afrotropical and the Palaearctic regions. 

Nemotelus are among the smallest (4.0 to 8.0 mm) Stratiomyidae. The species are black or (most)  black with more or less, often greatly extended white spots; the colouring is different in the two sexes. The head is round but the face has a pointed snout bearing the antennae on the dorsal side. The facial lobe, below the antennae, is conical and prominent and the whole facial area is pushed anteriorly by the expansion of the parafacials, and of the frons immediately above the antennae. The eyes of the male almost meet, and the eyes  have smaller facets in the ventral part. The proboscis is geniculate. Body-shape and wing-venation are generally similar to that of Oxycera  except that R4+5 is usually forked, and R 2+a is faint. The basal segment of gonopods in male on the lower side is fused with the hypandrium which has two more or less elongated median outgrowths;basal segment with lateral outgrowth at apex on outer side. Nemotelus species are not lively, and are easily caught with the fingers. They occur in the neighbourhood of water, in fens and similar localities, where they often are seen on the flowers of Umbelliferae and Compositae, sometimes in large numbers. Some of them seem to prefer salt marshes.<ref>Seguy. E. Faune de France Faune n° 13 1926. Diptères Brachycères. 308 p., 685 fig.</ref>

Selected species
Subgenus CamptopeltaN. aldrichi (Williston, 1917)N. nigrinus Fallén, 1817N. wilfordhansoni (Woodley, 2001)
Subgenus NemotelusN. albitarsis Lindner, 1965N. annulipes Lindner, 1965N. assimilis Lindner, 1965N. barracloughi (Mason, 1997)N. basilaris (Woodley, 2001)N. mongolia (Woodley, 2001)N. natalensis Lindner, 1965N. nigribasis Lindner, 1965N. notatus Zetterstedt, 1842N. pantherinus (Linnaeus, 1758)N. stuckenbergi Lindner, 1965N. tricolor Lindner, 1965N. tschorsnigi (Mason, 1997)N. uliginosus'' (Linnaeus, 1767)

See also
 List of Nemotelus species

References

Stratiomyidae
Diptera of Europe
Diptera of Africa
Brachycera genera
Taxa named by Étienne Louis Geoffroy